The men's madison competition at the 2018 UEC European Track Championships was held on 6 August 2018.

Results

Qualifying
In each heat, last two teams are not qualified for the final. 100 laps (25 km) with 10 sprints were raced.

Heat 1

Heat 2

Final
200 laps (50 km) with 20 sprints were raced.

References

Men's madison
European Track Championships – Men's madison